The Flat Bridge is a beam bridge across the Rio Cobre on the A1 road connecting the Jamaican capital Kingston, with the north coast tourist areas of Dunn's River and Ocho Rios. It is one of the oldest bridges in Jamaica.

History
While it cannot be positively ascertained when this bridge was built, it was definitely constructed after 1724. Edward Long describes it in his History of Jamaica printed in 1774: 

When the bridge was being constructed, the sixteen plantations in the Bog Walk area were obliged to send one enslaved African in every fifty to work on the River Road, sometimes called Sixteen Mile Walk. Gravel, marl, lime, sand and stone had to be dug. Slaves often lost their lives as they performed dangerous tasks in the Gorge. Contracts for timber and for masons to work on the bridge were authorized at vestry meetings.

Between 1881 and 1915, the floor of the bridge was washed away and later re-floored with iron girders and buckle plates taken from the original flooring of the May Pen bridge. Today, the bridge of three spans is supported by two piers and two abutments. In the 1930s it had metal handrails and later wooden ones, but these were devoured by the river at different times. Hemispheres of stone are now the only protection on the bridge itself.

Traffic
Flat Bridge is a part of the busy A1 road and carries a single lane so traffic is managed by traffic lights. 

The bridge is often flooded after heavy rains. In such times, motorists are advised to take alternative routes through Barry and Sligoville.

References

External links
 Aerial view
 Some information about who might be the bridge architect
 Bridge information as published by Jamaican National Heritage Trust
 Another article about this bridge

Bridges completed in 1770
Bridges in Jamaica
Buildings and structures in Saint Catherine Parish
Beam bridges
Stone bridges
Road bridges
1770 establishments in the British Empire